Mango Hill is a suburb in the Moreton Bay Region, Queensland, Australia.

History 
Although locally known by this name since the 1950s, it wasn't until 1 September 1980 that it was formally decreed. The name Mango Hill was chosen to commemorate the section of Mango trees (Magnifera indica) that were planted along the 700 metre (2,300 ft) section of Anzac Avenue that passes through the area.

In March 2006, the Department of Natural Resources, Mines and Water subdivided the northern section of Mango Hill to form the suburb of North Lakes.

Although now separated, the area still reaps the benefits of the major infrastructure and retail upgrades that have taken place in North Lakes in recent years, including the Redcliffe Peninsula railway line and shopping outlets such as Costco and IKEA. This has resulted in a significant boost to economic growth in the Moreton Bay Region.

North Lakes State College opened on 1 January 2002. This school is now within North Lakes.

The Lakes College opened on 24 January 2005. This school is now within North Lakes.

St Benedict's Catholic Primary School opened in 2008.

The other top responses for country of birth were England 8.3%, New Zealand 6.4%, South Africa 2.3%, Scotland 1.1%, Philippines 0.8%.  89.5% of people spoke only English at home; the next most common languages were 0.8% Afrikaans, 0.6% Hindi, 0.6% Samoan, 0.6% Spanish, 0.5% Mandarin.

Mango Hill State School opened on 1 January 2012.

St Benedict's Catholic College opened in February 2013.

Mango Hill State Secondary College opened on 1 January 2020. It officially opened on 26 August 2020.

Heritage listing 
On 5 February 2009, Anzac Avenue (the road itself) was awarded heritage listed status. The memorial site is a tribute to soldiers lost in World War I and has been in various stages of development since 1925. The section of Anzac Avenue (between the Bruce Highway and Kinsellas Road) that passes through Mango Hill has  of mango trees (Magnifera indica) as part of a commemorative tree planting. The suburb takes its name from the trees.

Education 
Mango Hill State School is a government primary (Prep-6) school for boys and girls at Bonnet Parade. In 2017, the school had an enrolment of 978 students with 63 teachers (58 full-time equivalent) and 43 non-teaching staff (26 full-time equivalent). It includes a special education program.

Mango Hill State Secondary College is a government secondary school for boys and girls in Richard Road. In its first year of operation (2020) it offered Years 7 & 8 only but will expand its offering each year until 2024 when the full range of Years 7 to 12 will be offered.

St Benedict's Catholic Primary School is a Catholic primary (Prep-6) school for boys and girls at 22 St Benedict's Close. In 2017, the school had an enrolment of 645 students with 39 teachers (33 full-time equivalent) and 31 non-teaching staff (19 full-time equivalent).

St Benedict's College is a Catholic secondary (7-12) school for boys and girls at 21 St Benedict's Close. In 2017, the school had an enrolment of 513 students with 42 teachers (40 full-time equivalent) and 28 non-teaching staff (19 full-time equivalent).

Community groups 
The Mango Hill Group of the Queensland Country Women's Association meets at Danzy Buchanan Park on Chermside Road.

Transport
Mango Hill railway station and Mango Hill East railway station opened on 4 October 2016.

The 681 and 682 local loop bus service provides transport throughout the suburb connecting it to train services at Mango Hill railway station. The 687 service runs from Mango Hill railway station to the nearby suburb of North Lakes conducting a loop in North Lakes. The 680 bus also travels along Anzac Avenue providing connections to Redcliffe and Chermside via Petrie and Strathpine.

References

External links

 

 
Suburbs of Moreton Bay Region